Coledale may refer to:

 Coledale (Cumbria), a valley in the English Lake District
 Coledale, New South Wales, a suburb of Wollongong in New South Wales, Australia
 Coledale, New South Wales, part of the suburb of West Tamworth, New South Wales